Macam Macam Aznil (commonly Macam-macam Aznil) is a family talk show hosted by Aznil Hj Nawawi.

Awards

2007  
Best Talk Show (Anugerah Skrin 2007)

2005  
 Best Talk Show (Asian Television Award 2005) * Best TV Host (Anugerah Sri Angkasa 2005) - Aznil Nawawi

2004  
 Best TV Show (Anugerah Sri Angkasa 2004)

Malaysian television talk shows